Ghanpur is a Census town in Jangaon district of the Indian state of Telangana. It is located in Ghanpur mandal.

References

Mandals in Jangaon district
Villages in Jangaon district